Events from the year 1997 in Iran.

Incumbents
 Supreme Leader: Ali Khamenei
 President: Akbar Hashemi Rafsanjani (until August 2), Mohammad Khatami (starting August 2)
 Vice President: Hassan Habibi
 Chief Justice: Mohammad Yazdii

Events
 Iranian presidential election, 1997.
 28 February – The 6.1  Ardabil earthquake affected northern Iran with a maximum Mercalli intensity of VIII (Severe), killing 1,100, injuring 2,600, and leaving 36,000 homeless.
 10 May – The 7.3  Qayen earthquake affected eastern Iran with a maximum Mercalli intensity of X (Extreme). At least 1,567 were killed and 2,300 were injured.
 2 August – Mohammad Khatami became president of Iran.

See also
 Years in Iraq
 Years in Afghanistan

References

 
Iran
Years of the 20th century in Iran
1990s in Iran
Iran